Bernd Jakubowski (10 December 1952 – 25 July 2007) was an East German footballer who played as a goalkeeper.

Career
Jakubowski began his career with Hansa Rostock, but moved to Dynamo Dresden in 1970, where he would spend the remainder of his career. His move to Dresden was allegedly not entirely voluntary. He allegedly had to choose between military service or playing for Dynamo Dresden.  Initially he was the reserve keeper in Dresden, understudying Claus Boden, but he eventually took over the number 1 shirt, and he went on to play 183 games in the DDR-Oberliga, and 31 more in Europe.

The bitterest moment of Jakubowski's career was perhaps a Cup Winners' Cup tie against western neighbours Bayer Uerdingen. Dynamo were leading in the first half, but a tackle from Wolfgang Funkel caused Jakubowski to be taken off with injury. His replacement, Jens Ramme, conceded six goals in the second half, and Dynamo were out.

Jakubowski won the silver medal as part of the East German team at the 1980 Olympics. He wasn't the first choice goalkeeper but played one match in the group stage during the Moscow Games.

After his retirement he continued to work for Dynamo Dresden in various roles, including Director of Football and Assistant Manager. He died in 2007 in Dresden.

References

External links
 
 
 
 DFB profile

1952 births
2007 deaths
Sportspeople from Rostock
Association football goalkeepers
German footballers
East German footballers
Footballers at the 1980 Summer Olympics
Olympic footballers of East Germany
Olympic silver medalists for East Germany
FC Hansa Rostock players
Dynamo Dresden players
Dynamo Dresden non-playing staff
Olympic medalists in football
DDR-Oberliga players
Recipients of the Patriotic Order of Merit in bronze
Medalists at the 1980 Summer Olympics
Footballers from Mecklenburg-Western Pomerania